Hands in the Hair is a 2005 Chinese-Hong Kong romantic ethical film directed by Jiang Cheng and produced by Stanley Kwan. The film stars Rosamund Kwan, Wallace Huo and Francis Ng. It is produced jointly by Shanghai Film Group Corporation and Shanghai Film Studio. The film is an adaptation of Tang Ying's 1995 novel of A Beauty. The film picks up the extramarital love story of a Shanghai named woman Aini and her lover Ah Hua. Hands in the Hair premiered in mainland China on 7 March 2005 and released in Hong Kong on 14 April 2005.

Cast
 Rosamund Kwan as Aini
 Wallace Huo as Ah Hua
 Francis Ng as Aini's husband
 Yang Lu as Lu Lu
 Zhu Hong as An Weiya
 Mao Yongming as Ah Fu
 Wang Hui as Jin Ping
 Gu Zhujun as Xiao Wang
 Guo Xiaoting as Yao Yao
 Zhan Huakang as the neighbor

Production
Shanghai Film Group Corporation and Shanghai Film Studio bought the film rights to the 1995 novel A Beauty written by Tang Ying. Zhang Xian, the husband of Tang Ying, signed on to write the script for the film. While for the most part a faithful retelling of the novel, the screenplay does contain minor deviation.

Director Jiang Cheng revealed that actress Michelle Reis was considered as the female lead at first, after conversation, Jiang Cheng found that she was not suitable for the feminine lead.

Release
The film was released on March 7, 2005, in mainland China, and on April 14, in Hong Kong.

References

External links
 
 
 

2005 films
2000s Mandarin-language films
2000s Cantonese-language films
Chinese romance films
Films set in Shanghai
2000s romance films